The Council of National Institutes of Technology, Science Education and Research (NITSER) commonly known as the Council of NITs, is the supreme governing body of India's National Institutes of Technology (NITs), Indian Institute of Engineering Science and Technology (IIESTS) and Indian Institutes of Science Education and Research (IISERs) as per provisions under Section 30 of the National Institutes of Technology, Science Education and Research Act, 2007 (NITSER Act 2007). The Council of NITSER consists of chairmen, directors of all NITs, IIEST and IISERs along with the government nominees from various sectors with the Minister of Education as the Chairman of the Council. The Council of NITSER is the highest decision making body in the NIT, IIEST and IISER fraternities and is answerable only to the Government of India. The Council of NITSER is expected to meet regularly and take steps conducive for maximum growth of the NITs, IIEST and IISERs as whole in the near future.

Composition
The Council of NITSER is created under the NITSER Act 2007 and its present composition stands as follows:

 The President of India is the Visitor of all the NITs and IIEST, who also appoints their Chairpersons and Directors as per provisions under the NITSER Act, 2007.
 Council of NITSER headed by Hon'ble HRM, is the apex decision making body comprising the Chairpersons and the Directors NITs & IIEST beside other members including three Members of Parliament.
 The Board of Governors is the apex decision making body in each of these Institutions.
 Senate is empowered to frame and revise curricula and syllabi for the course of studies for various departments and to promote research in academic development activities.
 A large number of rules, regulations, ordinance, policy decisions etc. have been formulated by the Board of Governors, Senate and other authorities of the Institute for regulating the day-to-day work of the expanded activities of the Institute.

Terms of the Council of NITSER
The duration of office of a member is three years from the date of notification provided that the term of office of an ex officio member shall continue so long as he holds office by virtue of which he is such a member and shall expire as soon as he ceases to be Member of the House, which elected him. The term of a member nominated or elected to fill a casual vacancy shall continue for the remainder of the term of the member in whose place he has been appointed and an outgoing member shall, unless the Central Government otherwise directs, continue in office until another person is appointed as a member in his place.

Function of the Council of NITSER
It shall be the general duty of the Council to co-ordinate the activities of all the NITs, IISER and IISERs without prejudice. The Council shall perform the following functions, namely:

 To recommend regulations regarding transactions of business by the Council viz., frequency of meeting, quorum for a meeting and such other connected business transactions;
 To recommend guidelines and regulations regarding empowerment of Chairman of the Council to deal with specific matters as well as matters of emergency on behalf of the Council in consultation with the Standing Committee;
 To advise the Chairman of the Council whether an item requires urgent consideration by him.
 To finalise agenda items for the consideration of the council.
 To advise the Chairman of the Council on specific items within his purview as well as any emergency matters that may be referred to him;
 To draft resolutions which would empower the council to make statutes of common policy covering all NITs;
 To formulate guidelines on items/issues to be considered and approved by the Standing Committee on behalf of the Council;
 To recommend the structure of the Council's Secretariat for consideration of the Government;
 To screen all proposals coming within the purview of the Council under the National Institutes of Technology Act, 2007 and make appropriate recommendations to the council;
 To consider all items within the jurisdiction of the Council and referred by the various Board of Governors of the individual NITs or the individual Directors of the NITs or other groups within the NITs, such as the Senates and the Faculty Associations or the Council for items within his purview for emergent consideration or to the Council itself at a normal scheduled meeting or for final disposal for items delegated to the Standing Committee.

References

External links 
NIT Act 2007
NIT (Amendment) Act 2012
Comprehensive NIT Act 2012
NITSER Act 2014: Inclusion of BESU as IIEST Shibpur
Gazette Notification NIT (Amendment) Act 2017
Amendment in the First Statutes of NITs
Amendment in the Statutes of IIEST, Shibpur
Statutes of NIT, Andhra Pradesh

National Institutes of Technology